Oscar Chelle (born 19 February 1922) was a Uruguayan footballer. He played in one match for the Uruguay national football team in 1947. He was also part of Uruguay's squad for the 1947 South American Championship.

References

External links
 

1922 births
Possibly living people
Uruguayan footballers
Uruguay international footballers
Place of birth missing (living people)
Association football midfielders
Montevideo Wanderers F.C. players